Gmina Poświętne may refer to any of the following rural administrative districts in Poland:
Gmina Poświętne, Podlaskie Voivodeship
Gmina Poświętne, Łódź Voivodeship
Gmina Poświętne, Masovian Voivodeship